Andrew McFarlane (born 6 June 1951) is an Australian actor with many stage and screen credits.

Personal life
McFarlane was born in Albany, Western Australia. After the family moved to Melbourne he attended Camberwell Grammar School and was involved in school plays and school cadets. He has long been open about his homosexuality.

Career
After making his TV debut in Crawfords police dramas Homicide and Matlock Police, he won a recurring role on Division 4 before joining World War II soap opera The Sullivans as oldest son John Sullivan.

He left the series after eighteen months and in the storyline John was reported missing in action – the writers left his final fate unresolved in the hope McFarlane would return to the show. McFarlane returned to the role in the TV movie The John Sullivan Story. The role gained McFarlane a Sammy Award for best supporting actor in a TV series in 1977.

He later took the lead role in the miniseries The Flying Doctors, reprising the role in the ongoing series that followed. Again he left the series after 16 episodes at the height of its popularity. However, he returned in the fifth season for another 37 episodes. He also appeared in Rafferty's Rules as "Police Prosecutor Gibson". McFarlane has since played the father of Tasha Andrews in soap opera Home and Away and in 2005 played Bobby Hoyland in the soap opera Neighbours.

He has been a Play School presenter since 2000 and was also one of Governor Phillip's people on Australian History on ABC. He acted in the TV series Spellbinder as Brian Reynolds, Paul's father and played Hugh Delaney in the miniseries The Alice.

In 2009 he portrayed prominent Australian anti-drugs campaigner and murder victim Donald Mackay in the series Underbelly: A Tale of Two Cities. He appeared in a musical for the first time in 2010 in Fame – The Musical at the Capitol Theatre, Sydney.

McFarlane had regular or leading roles in television series Love Child (2014), Devil's Playground and Glitch (both 2015).

Filmography

Film

Television

References

External links

1951 births
Australian male film actors
Australian male stage actors
Australian male television actors
Australian gay actors
Living people
People from Albany, Western Australia
Australian children's television presenters
20th-century Australian male actors
21st-century Australian male actors
21st-century LGBT people